Leon Aaron Edwards (born 25 August 1991) is an English professional mixed martial artist. He currently competes in the Welterweight division in the Ultimate Fighting Championship (UFC), where he is the reigning UFC Welterweight Champion. A professional competitor since 2011, Edwards formerly competed for BAMMA, where he was the BAMMA Welterweight Champion. As of March 7, 2023, he is #4 in the UFC men's pound-for-pound rankings.

Background 
Edwards was born in Kingston, Jamaica, and lived with his parents and his brother in a one-room house. Growing up, he was surrounded by crime, and his father was involved in what he describes as "questionable activities". Edwards moved to the Aston area of Birmingham, England at age nine, and his father was shot and killed in a nightclub in London when Edwards was thirteen. He was then involved in criminal activity such as drug dealing, street fighting, and knife possession along with his social circle, but was able to get out of his lifestyle at age 17, when his mother got him to join an MMA club.

Mixed martial arts career

Early career
Edwards began his professional fighting career in 2010, making his debut as an amateur at Bushido Challenge 2 - A New Dawn. Edwards fought Carl Booth, winning via Armbar submission in round two.

Fight UK MMA
Edwards then signed a contract with Fight UK MMA. He debuted for the promotion against Damian Zlotnicki, winning via technical knockout in the first round. He had two more fights for the promotion, winning against Pawel Zwiefka and losing against Delroy McDowell via DQ by way of an illegal knee.

Post-Fight UK MMA
Edwards obtained a 2–1 record after leaving Fight UK MMA. He then fought Craig White at the Strength and Honor 14, winning by decision. Edwards then went to fight for "BAMMA", in which he went 5–0. During his stint with BAMMA, he won the welterweight championship against Wayne Murrie and he defended it once against Shaun Taylor in what was his last fight with BAMMA before going to the UFC.

Ultimate Fighting Championship
Edwards made his promotional debut against Cláudio Silva on 8 November 2014 at UFC Fight Night: Shogun vs. Saint Preux. He was defeated via split decision.

Edwards faced veteran Seth Baczynski on 11 April 2015 at UFC Fight Night 64. Edwards won the fight via KO at 0:08 of the first round. This result earned him a Performance of the Night bonus and marked one of the sixth fastest knockouts in the organization.

Edwards faced Pawel Pawlak on 18 July 2015 at UFC Fight Night 72. He won the fight via unanimous decision.

Edwards next faced eventual UFC champion Kamaru Usman on 19 December 2015 at UFC on Fox 17.  He lost the fight by unanimous decision.

Edwards faced Dominic Waters on 8 May 2016 at UFC Fight Night 87. He won the fight via unanimous decision.

Edwards next faced Albert Tumenov on 8 October 2016 at UFC 204. He won the fight via submission in the third round.

Edwards faced Vicente Luque on 18 March 2017 at UFC Fight Night 107. He won the fight by unanimous decision.

Edwards faced Bryan Barberena on 2 September 2017 at UFC Fight Night 115. He won the fight by unanimous decision.

Edwards faced Peter Sobotta on 17 March 2018 at UFC Fight Night 127. He won the fight via TKO at 4:59 in the third round.

Edwards faced Donald Cerrone on 23 June 2018 at UFC Fight Night 132. He won the fight via unanimous decision.

Edwards faced Gunnar Nelson on 16 March 2019 at UFC Fight Night 147. He won the bout by split decision. After the event, Edwards was punched backstage by Jorge Masvidal, which left Edwards with a laceration under his left eye.

Edwards faced former UFC lightweight champion Rafael dos Anjos on 20 July 2019 in the main event of UFC on ESPN 4. He won the fight via unanimous decision.

As the first bout of his new, multi-fight contract, Edwards was scheduled to face Tyron Woodley on 21 March 2020 at UFC Fight Night: Woodley vs. Edwards. However, the restrictions related to COVID-19 forced Edwards to withdraw as the event was meant to be moved from London to the United States, and the event was subsequently cancelled.

After a 425-day hiatus since his bout with Dos Anjos, the UFC had removed Edwards from the UFC rankings due to inactivity on 22 October 2020. However, one day later, it was announced that he had been scheduled to face undefeated prospect Khamzat Chimaev in the main event of UFC Fight Night 183 on 19 December 2020. This involved Edwards being back to the #3 spot in the UFC rankings. On 29 November, it was announced that Chimaev had allegedly tested positive for COVID-19, which meant the bout was declared on jeopardy. On 1 December, Edwards officially tested positive for COVID-19 and allegedly lost twelve pounds due to the severity of his case, so the bout was subsequently postponed. On 22 December, it was announced that the contest has been rescheduled for 20 January 2021, at UFC Fight Night 185. In turn, Chimaev pulled out of the contest on 29 December due to lingering effects of his own COVID-19 struggle. As a result, the bout was temporarily cancelled. On 13 January, the bout was scheduled for the third time, and was scheduled to headline UFC Fight Night 187 on 13 March 2021. However, on 11 February, UFC president Dana White announced the fight was once again cancelled due to Chimaev suffering from lingering effects of COVID-19. On February 18, it was announced that Belal Muhammad would be the replacement opponent for Edwards. During the beginning of the second round, Edwards accidentally poked Muhammad in the eye rendering him unable to continue. The fight was declared a no contest, snapping his 8-fight win streak.

Edwards was expected to face Nate Diaz on 15 May 2021 at UFC 262, marking the first time a non-main event and non-title bout had been scheduled for 5 rounds in UFC history. However, the bout was moved to UFC 263 due to a minor injury sustained by Diaz. Edwards controlled a vast majority of the bout, but was stunned badly with punches late in the fifth. Edwards won the fight by unanimous decision (49–46, 49–46, 49–46).

Edwards was scheduled to face Jorge Masvidal on 11 December 2021 at UFC 269. However, Masvidal withdrew due to injury and the bout was scrapped.

UFC Welterweight Champion

Edwards rematched Kamaru Usman on 20 August 2022 at UFC 278 for the UFC Welterweight Championship. Edwards won the fight and title via knockout in the fifth round, claiming the UFC Welterweight Championship. The win earned him the Performance of the Night award.

A third fight between Edwards and Usman took place on March 18, 2023, at UFC 286. After a point deduction in the third round due to grabbing the fence, he won the bout via majority decision.

Personal life
Leon grew up in Aston, Birmingham, England but is originally from Kingston, Jamaica. He started training mixed martial arts when he was 17. His nickname, Rocky, was given to him by his friends in school. His brother, Fabian, is also a mixed martial artist for Bellator MMA.

Championships and achievements

Mixed martial arts
Ultimate Fighting Championship
UFC Welterweight Championship (One time; current)
One successful title defense
First Jamaican-born champion in UFC history
Performance of the Night (Two Times) vs. Seth Baczynski and Kamaru Usman
Sixth-fastest finish in UFC history  (8 seconds)
Tied (Georges St-Pierre) for the second longest unbeaten streak in UFC Welterweight Division history (12)
BAMMA
BAMMA RDX Welterweight Championship (One time, former)
One successful title defence
MMAjunkie.com
2022 August Knockout of the Month 
ESPN
2022 Knockout of the Year 
Cageside Press
2022 Comeback of the Year 
2022 Knockout of the Year

Mixed martial arts record
 

|-
|Win
|align=center|21–3 (1)
|Kamaru Usman
|Decision (majority)
|UFC 286
|
|align=center|5
|align=center|5:00
|London, England
|
|-
|Win
|align=center|
|Kamaru Usman
|KO (head kick)
|UFC 278
|
|align=center|5
|align=center|4:04
|Salt Lake City, Utah, United States
|
|-
|Win
|align=center|19–3 (1)
|Nate Diaz
|Decision (unanimous)
|UFC 263
|
|align=center|5
|align=center|5:00
|Glendale, Arizona, United States
|
|-
|NC
|align=center|18–3 (1)
|Belal Muhammad
|NC (accidental eye poke)
|UFC Fight Night: Edwards vs. Muhammad
|
|align=center|2
|align=center|0:18
|Las Vegas, Nevada, United States
|
|-
|Win
|align=center|18–3
|Rafael dos Anjos
|Decision (unanimous)
|UFC on ESPN: dos Anjos vs. Edwards 
|
|align=center|5
|align=center|5:00
|San Antonio, Texas, United States
|
|-
|Win
|align=center|17–3
|Gunnar Nelson
|Decision (split)
|UFC Fight Night: Till vs. Masvidal
|
|align=center|3
|align=center|5:00
|London, England
|
|-
|Win
|align=center|16–3
|Donald Cerrone
|Decision (unanimous)
|UFC Fight Night: Cowboy vs. Edwards
|
|align=center|5
|align=center|5:00
|Kallang, Singapore
|
|-
|Win
|align=center|15–3
|Peter Sobotta
|TKO (punches) 
|UFC Fight Night: Werdum vs. Volkov
|
|align=center|3
|align=center|4:59
|London, England
|
|-
|Win
|align=center|14–3
|Bryan Barberena
|Decision (unanimous)
|UFC Fight Night: Volkov vs. Struve 
|
|align=center|3
|align=center|5:00
|Rotterdam, Netherlands
|
|-
|Win
|align=center|13–3
|Vicente Luque
|Decision (unanimous)
|UFC Fight Night: Manuwa vs. Anderson
|
|align=center|3
|align=center|5:00
|London, England
|
|-
|Win
|align=center|12–3
|Albert Tumenov
|Submission (rear-naked choke)
|UFC 204
|
|align=center|3
|align=center|3:01
|Manchester, England
|
|-
|Win
|align=center|11–3
|Dominic Waters
|Decision (unanimous)
|UFC Fight Night: Overeem vs. Arlovski
|
|align=center|3
|align=center|5:00
|Rotterdam, Netherlands
|
|-
|Loss
|align=center|10–3
|Kamaru Usman
|Decision (unanimous)
|UFC on Fox: dos Anjos vs. Cowboy 2 
|
|align=center|3
|align=center|5:00
|Orlando, Florida, United States
|
|-
|Win
|align=center|10–2
|Pawel Pawlak
|Decision (unanimous)
|UFC Fight Night: Bisping vs. Leites 
|
|align=center|3
|align=center|5:00
|Glasgow, Scotland
|
|-
| Win
|align=center| 9–2 
|Seth Baczynski
|KO (punches)
|UFC Fight Night: Gonzaga vs. Cro Cop 2
|
|align=center| 1
|align=center| 0:08
|Kraków, Poland
| 
|-
|Loss
|align=center| 8–2
|Cláudio Silva
|Decision (split) 
|UFC Fight Night: Shogun vs. Saint Preux
|
|align=center| 3
|align=center| 5:00
|Uberlândia, Brazil
| 
|-
| Win
|align=center| 8–1
|Shaun Taylor
|KO (punch)
|BAMMA 16
|
|align=center| 3
|align=center| 3:30
|Manchester, England
|
|-
| Win
|align=center| 7–1
| Wayne Murrie
| Submission (rear-naked choke)
|BAMMA 15
| 
|align=center| 3
|align=center| 3:13
|Hackney Wick, England
|
|-
| Win
|align=center| 6–1
| Wendle Lewis
| KO (punches)
|BAMMA 14
| 
|align=center| 1
|align=center| 1:20
|Birmingham, England
|
|-
| Win
|align=center| 5–1
| Adam Boussif
| Submission (arm-triangle choke)
|BAMMA 13
| 
|align=center| 1
|align=center| 2:10
|Birmingham, England
|
|-
| Win
|align=center| 4–1
| Jonathan Bilton
| TKO (knees)
|BAMMA 11
| 
|align=center| 2
|align=center| 1:11
|Birmingham, England
|
|-
| Win
|align=center| 3–1
| Craig White
| Technical Decision
|SAH 14: Strength And Honour 14
| 
|align=center| 2
|align=center| 5:00 
|Exeter, England
| 
|-
|Loss
|align=center| 2–1
| Delroy McDowell
| DQ (illegal knee)
|Fight UK MMA: Fight UK 6
| 
|align=center| 3
|align=center| 2:40
|Leicester, England
|
|-
| Win
|align=center| 2–0
| Pawel Zwiefka
| Decision (unanimous)
|Fight UK MMA: Fight UK 5
| 
|align=center| 3
|align=center| 5:00
|Leicester, England
|
|-
| Win
|align=center| 1–0
| Damian Zlotnicki
| TKO (punches)
|Fight UK MMA: Fight UK 4
| 
|align=center| 1
|align=center| 2:15
|Leicester, England
|
|}

Pay-per-view bouts

See also
 List of current UFC fighters
 List of male mixed martial artists

References

External links
 

 

1991 births
Living people
English male mixed martial artists
English practitioners of Brazilian jiu-jitsu
Jamaican male mixed martial artists
Jamaican practitioners of Brazilian jiu-jitsu
Sportspeople from Kingston, Jamaica
English sportspeople of Jamaican descent
Jamaican emigrants to the United Kingdom
Welterweight mixed martial artists
Mixed martial artists utilizing Brazilian jiu-jitsu
Ultimate Fighting Championship male fighters